Tribolodon nakamurai is a species of fish in the family Cyprinidae.
It is endemic to Japan.

References

Tribolodon
Fish described in 2000